The Edinburgh Student Law Review (ESLR) is an academic journal published at the University of Edinburgh; it is edited, written and peer-reviewed entirely by students.

The ESLR was established in 2008 and was the first journal of its kind in Scotland. It is currently sponsored by BARBRI International, DLA Piper LLP, Freshfields Bruckhaus Deringer, Thomson Reuters and Turcan Connell.

The Honorary President of the journal is Baron Hope of Craighead, former Deputy President of the Supreme Court of the United Kingdom, who previously studied at the School of Law in Edinburgh. The Honorary Secretary is Professor Andrew Steven, a former Scottish Law Commissioner.

See also
 Edinburgh Law Review
 SCRIPT-ed

External links
 Edinburgh Student Law Review
 University of Edinburgh

References

University of Edinburgh
British law journals
Magazines published in Scotland
Scots law